Robert Anning Bell  (14 April 1863 – 27 November 1933) was an English artist and designer.

Early life
Robert Anning Bell was born in London on 14 April 1863, the son of Robert George Bell, a cheesemonger, and Mary Charlotte Knight. He studied at University College School, the Westminster College of Art and the Royal Academy Schools, followed by a time in Paris.

Career
Bell was articled as an architect to his uncle, Samuel Knight.

On his return he shared a studio with George Frampton. With Frampton he created a series of designs for an altarpiece which was exhibited at the Arts and Crafts Exhibition Society and later installed in the Church of St Clare, Liverpool.

From 1895 to 1899 Bell was an instructor at the Liverpool University school of architecture. During this time he became associated with the Della Robbia Pottery in Birkenhead and also was becoming increasingly successful as a book designer and illustrator.

In 1911 Bell was appointed chief of the design section at the Glasgow School of Art, and from 1918 to 1924 he was professor of design at the Royal College of Art. He continued to paint and exhibited at the Royal Academy, the New English Art Club and the Royal Society of Painters in Water Colours, as well as at the Society of Graphic Art's first exhibition in 1921. In 1921 he was elected as Master of the Art Workers' Guild. He designed the great mosaic in the tympanum at Westminster Cathedral from sketches left by the architect John Francis Bentley; the work was completed in 1916. Bell worked from 1922 on mosaics for the Palace of Westminster. Depictions of Saint Patrick of Ireland and Saint Andrew of Scotland were erected in the Central Lobby; in Saint Stephen's Hall, one panel was erected depicting Saint Stephen, King Stephen and Edward the Confessor and another showing Edward III presenting the design for St Stephen's Chapel to his Master Mason, Michael of Canterbury. The last of these mosaics was unveiled in 1926.

Personal life
His second wife was fellow artist Laura Richard whom he married in 1914 (he had previously been married to Amy Caroline Ditcham in 1900). He had no children by either wife; Laura lost her only son (Charles Antoine Richard Troncy) by her previous husband (the artist Emile Troncy) in the First World War. He died in London on 27 November 1933, aged 70, and his ashes were interred in St James's Church, Piccadilly. A memorial to him lies above them.

Gallery

References

External links

 

UNCG American Publishers' Trade Bindings: Robert Anning Bell
Charles Lamb's Tales from Shakespeare illustrated by Robert Anning Bell on the University of Florida's Digital Collections
 Profile on Royal Academy of Arts Collections

1863 births
1933 deaths
19th-century English painters
English male painters
20th-century English painters
English designers
Painters from London
People educated at University College School
Royal Academicians
Burials at St James's Church, Piccadilly
Masters of the Art Worker's Guild
20th-century English male artists
19th-century English male artists